Aoraki Polytechnic was a public New Zealand tertiary education institution. Aoraki Polytechnic's main campus was based in central Timaru, South Canterbury, South Island. It also had campuses offering a variety of programmes in Ashburton, Oamaru, Christchurch and Dunedin. In March 2016, Aoraki Polytechnic merged with the Christchurch Polytechnic Institute of Technology to form Ara Institute of Canterbury.

In 2015 Aoraki Polytechnic had 1,021 Equivalent Full Time students (EFTS) and approximately 93 Full Time Equivalent (FTE) Academic Staff and 44 FTE Support staff.

Southern Upload
Southern Upload was a television show produced by Aoraki's Film and Television students, which started in 2011.

Alumni 

 Sinead Boucher - journalist and chief executive of Stuff Ltd

References

Vocational education in New Zealand
Timaru
Universities and colleges in New Zealand